The Heart of Chicago 1967–1997 is the fifth greatest hits album, and twenty-third album overall, by the American band Chicago, released in 1997.  It was compiled to commemorate the group's 30th anniversary of their formation.

The idea was to bridge their two eras on one CD: the James William Guercio and Columbia Records period of the 1970s, and the David Foster and Warner Bros. Records period of the 1980s.  In addition, the band added two new songs, "The Only One" produced by Lenny Kravitz and "Here in My Heart" by James Newton Howard. Both of these new tracks were successful in the adult contemporary market; "Here in My Heart" topped the AC charts, and "The Only One" was a top 20 AC hit.

Though the album was certified gold following its April 1997 release, many critics and fans disapproved of the concept, due to the clashing styles of both decades, and the lack of many significant hits such as "25 or 6 to 4", "Call on Me", and "What Kind of Man Would I Be?". To balance this out, a second album, The Heart of Chicago 1967–1998 Volume II was released the following year to fill in the missing gaps that were left in the first one.  Rhino Records' 2002 two-CD release The Very Best of Chicago: Only the Beginning, with chronological sequencing, is generally considered to supersede both volumes of The Heart of Chicago.

Track listing
"You're the Inspiration" (Peter Cetera/David Foster) – 3:49 
"If You Leave Me Now" (Cetera) – 3:55 
"Make Me Smile" (Single version) (James Pankow) – 2:59 
"Hard Habit to Break" (Steve Kipner/Jon Parker) – 4:44 
"Saturday in the Park" (Robert Lamm) – 3:55 
"Wishing You Were Here" (Cetera) – 4:35 
"The Only One" (Pankow/Greg O'Connor) – 5:59 
 A new recording produced and featuring backing vocals by Lenny Kravitz
"Colour My World" (Pankow) – 2:59 
"Look Away" (Diane Warren) – 4:00 
"Here in My Heart" (Glen Ballard/James Newton Howard) – 4:15 
 A new recording produced by James Newton Howard
"Just You 'n' Me" (Pankow) – 3:42 
"Does Anybody Really Know What Time It Is?" (Single version) (Lamm) – 3:19 
"Will You Still Love Me?" (Foster/Tom Keane/Richard Baskin) – 5:41 
"Beginnings" (Lamm) – 7:54 
"Hard to Say I'm Sorry/Get Away" (Cetera/Foster/Lamm) – 5:05

Chart performance
The Heart of Chicago 1967-1997 (Reprise 46554) reached No. 55 in the US and peaked at No. 21 in the UK.

Certifications

References

1997 greatest hits albums
Albums produced by James William Guercio
Albums produced by David Foster
Albums produced by Ron Nevison
Chicago (band) compilation albums
Reprise Records compilation albums